The Reuben Davis House, also known as Sunset Hill, is a U.S. national historic place located in Aberdeen, Mississippi. It is an impressive two-story antebellum mansion that was constructed between 1847 and 1853. Well known as the former residence of Reuben Davis, a prominent attorney, statesman, and author, the property has important historical connections for both the town of Aberdeen and Mississippi.

History

Design and construction
The Reuben Davis House is an imposing example of the Greek Revival style that was popular in the prosperous South during the mid-19th Century. The original structure was built in 1847 by D.F. Alexander and then remodeled and expanded by William Cunningham in 1853. The house expresses major stylistic references to Asher Benjamin's The Practical House Carpenter (1830) and Practice of Architecture (1833).

Location
The city of Aberdeen was incorporated in 1837. According to an article featured in the Aberdeen Examiner, the city is described as containing more antebellum homes than any other Mississippi town of a comparable size. In the mid 19th-century, the community grew from the development of a cotton port on the Tombigbee River. The town was made the county seat in 1849 and had a population of approximately 5,000 by the 1850 census. However, the prosperity and economic growth declined after 1850 when the Mobile and Ohio Railway Company constructed a line eight miles west of the town.

Reuben Davis
Reuben Davis (January 18, 1813 – October 14, 1890) was a prominent figure in 19th century Mississippi. He served as a prosecuting attorney for Mississippi's sixth judicial district from 1835 to 1839, and a judge of the high court of appeals in 1842. During the Mexican–American War he was a colonel in the Second Regiment of Mississippi Volunteers. In 1855 he was elected to the Mississippi House of Representatives and in 1857 to the U.S. House of Representatives for the Thirty-fifth and Thirty-sixth Congress. In 1861 he withdrew from this position to become the Monroe County candidate for the state secession convention. That same year he became a Mississippi representative to the Confederate Congress in Richmond, Virginia. During the Civil War he was a brigadier general in the Confederate Army. Following the Civil War, Davis returned to Aberdeen to resume his law practice. He purchased Sunset Hill in 1869. It was at this residence that Davis raised his family (with his second wife) and wrote the historical reference Recollections of Mississippi and Mississippians. He remained at Sunset Hill until his death in 1890 and was buried at the Odd Fellows Cemetery. His wife died 22 years later, in 1912. Prior to her death, she had requested that her body be laid in state on top of the grand piano in her parlor and surrounded with roses; a wish which was honored.

Modern times
Over the next 36 years, the property changed owners multiple times. One of the owners, from 1937 to 1943, was a grandniece of Reuben Davis, Mrs. Edmonia Nichols. During the 1940s the house was utilized as an apartment complex and its condition deteriorated. In 1948 the property and the one acre on which it now stands was sold to Drs. Chester and Catherine Brummett. In 1961 Sunset Hill was sold to Mr. & Mrs. W. Emerson Jones. The Jones' made substantial improvements and renovations during their ownership of the property. 

The U.S. Department of the Interior added Sunset Hill (listed as the Reuben Davis House) to The National Register of Historic Places in November 1978. The Mississippi Department of Archives and History officially designated Sunset Hill as a Mississippi Landmark in February 1987. The house was sold in 1992, and again in 1997 to its current owners.  Additional renovations have taken place over the last 15 years, including restoration of the Reuben Davis office.

Architecture
The architecture of Sunset Hill is described with great detail in the National Register Form:

Tourism
Given its rich history and cultural significance, Sunset Hill attracts a number of visitors each year. The home was featured in the 2013 Aberdeen Pilgrimage and Christmas Holiday Home Tour. In the future, the residents may open select bedrooms to the public as a "bed and breakfast."

Gallery

References

Houses on the National Register of Historic Places in Mississippi
Houses in Monroe County, Mississippi
National Register of Historic Places in Monroe County, Mississippi
Slave cabins and quarters in the United States